Dushman Duniya Ka  is a 1996 Hindi-language drama film, produced by Ashok Mishra, Babubhai, Masoom Ali under the Canmore Cinema banner and directed by Mehmood. It stars Jeetendra, Sumalatha, Manzoor Ali, Laila  while Shah Rukh Khan and Salman Khan have given special appearances and the music was composed by Anu Malik. The film is a debut to Laila and Manzoor Ali. The film was a box office failure.

Plot
The movie focuses on Mahesh (Jeetendra), an honest and diligent young man, who has no knowledge of his background as he was raised in an orphanage. One day, out with his friend Badru (Shahrukh Khan), he meets Reshma (Sumalatha), who is also an orphan. Badru advises Mahesh to make a move on her, though as he approaches her, the two fall in love and Badru decides to get them married. They then live a harmonious life and soon are proud parents of a healthy young boy who they name Lucky (Manzoor Ali). Lucky grows up to be as honest and diligent as his dad, and his future appears to be very bright. When Lucky sees his father smoking, he starts to as well, but when his father stops him, he explains that an old man around his school sells him cigarettes. When Badru and Mahesh approach the old man, he tries to run. Badru chases after him and is then run over by a truck. Badru tragically dies, leaving Mahesh, Reshma, and Lucky on their own.

Years later, when Lucky grows up, he falls in love with Lata (Laila), and both plan to marry soon with the blessings of their respective parents. Then Mahesh's world is turned upside down when he finds drugs in Lucky's pocket. He speaks to Lucky about this, and Lucky promises to give up drugs forever and does live up to his promise. While driving home one day, Mahesh witnesses a drug peddler selling drugs to a group of youths which also included Lucky. He notifies the police, and they arrest the youths, but the peddler manages to escape. All the other youth tested positive for drugs, except for Lucky. When he returns home, his parents refuse to believe him, this angers him and he and his father come close to fisticuffs.

Mahesh asks Lucky to leave, and he does so. Even Lata has left him as she doesn't want to upset his father, Mahesh. Lucky regresses to drugs and his friends until he runs out of money. Now he must either steal or even consider killing someone for money and the only ones he could think of taking money from are his parents. What will be Lucky's fate?

Cast 
Jeetendra as Mahesh Thakur
Sumalatha as Reshma
Manzoor Ali as Lucky, Mahesh's and Reshma's son. 
Laila as Lata, Lucky's love interest.
Nasirr Khan as Mushtaq
Johnny Lever as Head Master / College Lecturer
Farida Jalal as the Manager of women's shelter.
Anjana Mumtaz as Asha, Lata's mother.
Mehmood as Bakrewale Baba
Ali Asgar as Raman, Lucky's friend.
Shahrukh Khan as Badru, Rickshaw driver (special appearance)
Salman Khan as himself
Jankidas Mehra as Jankidas
Manmauji as Shop-Keeper
Ashok Kumar as Doctor
Lilliput as Professor Liliput
Raza Murad
Jagdish Raj as Police Inspector
Kailash Nath as Drug Dealer

Soundtrack 
All songs were penned by Ravindra Jain.

Production
The film marked the debut of Mehmood Ali's son Manzoor Ali, who did not act in any film after this. Actors Shahrukh Khan and Salman Khan both have special appearances in the film, although they were seen in every trailer and promo of the film. They are both also shown together in all the posters of the film. Shahrukh only has a 15-minute role at the beginning of the film and Salman has a five-minute role halfway through the film. Done as a favor to Mehmood, Salman and Shah Rukh Khan's star power was relatively safe however the roles have been mocked. This movie also featured a song from famous singer and Mehmood Ali's elder son Lucky Ali "Nasha Nasha", which was his comeback song in Bollywood as a playback singer after 22 years.

References

External links 
 

1996 films
1990s Hindi-language films
Films scored by Anu Malik